Mij (also Romanized as Mīj and Meyj; also known as Mājak) is a village in Rahmat Rural District, Seyyedan District, Marvdasht County, Fars Province, Iran. At the 2006 census, its population was 802, in 185 families.

References 

Populated places in Marvdasht County